George Feeney is a New Hampshire politician, and currently serves in the New Hampshire House of Representatives.

Feeney has been serving in the New Hampshire House of Representatives since 2018. He served in the United States Army from 1968 to 1970 and attended Newbury College.

References

Living people
Newbury College (United States) alumni
Republican Party members of the New Hampshire House of Representatives
21st-century American politicians
Year of birth missing (living people)